A list of the films produced in Mexico in 1948 (see 1948 in film):

1948

External links

1948
Films
Lists of 1948 films by country or language